Alliance & Leicester plc was a British bank and former building society, formed by the merger in 1985 of the Alliance Building Society and the Leicester Building Society. The business demutualised in the middle of 1997, when it was floated on the London Stock Exchange. It was listed in the FTSE 250 Index, and had been listed in the FTSE 100 Index from April 1997 until June 2008.

After running into difficulty during the financial crisis, the bank was acquired by the Santander Group in October 2008, and transferred its business into Santander UK plc in May 2010.

It was fully integrated and rebranded as Santander by the end of 2011. The bank's international subsidiary based in Douglas, Isle of Man, Alliance & Leicester International, continued to use the name Alliance & Leicester, until it was fully merged into Santander UK in May 2013.

History

Early history
The Alliance & Leicester Building Society was formed by the merger of the Alliance Building Society (originally based in and called the Brighton & Sussex Equitable Building Society) and the Leicester Building Society on 1 October 1985. In July 1990 the society acquired Girobank, a major provider of cash handling services to the government and large companies which also offered current accounts from the Post Office.

With other large building societies such as Halifax and Woolwich, Alliance & Leicester decided to float on the London Stock Exchange, generating windfall payments to members worth up to £5,000 each. Flotation took place on 21 April 1997.

From the end of the 1980s until the mid-1990s, Alliance & Leicester undertook a long-running television advertising campaign, featuring comedians Stephen Fry and Hugh Laurie.

Takeover
Alliance & Leicester had to be offered a secret £3 billion credit line by HM Treasury in November 2007 to prevent insolvency and a run on the bank. On 14 July 2008 the board of A&L recommended that shareholders accept a takeover bid from Banco Santander for around £1.26 billion. This recommendation was ratified by shareholders at meetings on 16 September 2008. The takeover took effect on 10 October 2008, when shares of the company were delisted from the London Stock Exchange.

The bank transferred its business into Santander UK on 28 May 2010, following a hearing at the Royal Courts of Justice on 13 May 2010, as part of the procedure within the Financial Services and Markets Act 2000.

Until this time, Alliance & Leicester was as a separate institution with its own banking licence while at the same time migrating customer accounts to the Partenon software system. Abbey and the Bradford & Bingley savings business were rebranded in January 2010. Branches of Alliance & Leicester were rebranded at the end of 2010.

Services

The four business sectors were mortgage lending and investments, personal banking, commercial banking and treasury. Alliance & Leicester provided current accounts, general insurance, life assurance, unit trusts, asset financing and commercial lending. The bank also operated Alliance & Leicester Commercial Bank. Credit cards were also provided through a partnership with MBNA until the acquisition by Santander.

Cards were subsequently reissued with MBNA branding, while Alliance & Leicester began solely providing Santander branded credit cards, provided by Santander Cards Limited. Selected investment products were also provided, together with those from Legal & General, with which the bank had a partnership.

Alliance & Leicester operated an international subsidiary based on the Isle of Man, which passed to Santander UK.

References

External links

Banco Santander
Leicester
British companies established in 1985
Banks established in 1985
Banks disestablished in 2011
1985 establishments in England
2011 disestablishments in England
Companies formerly listed on the London Stock Exchange